Paredes Viejas Airport ,  is an airstrip  east of Marchigüe, a town in the O'Higgins Region of Chile.

Runway 11 has an additional  of unpaved overrun. There is distant rising terrain north through southeast.

See also

Transport in Chile
List of airports in Chile

References

External links
OpenStreetMap - Paredes Viejas
OurAirports - Paredes Viejas
FallingRain - Paredes Viejas Airport

Airports in Chile
Airports in O'Higgins Region